The Permanent Mission of Mexico to the Organization of American States is the diplomatic mission of Mexico to the Organization of American States in Washington D.C..

Location 
The Permanent Mission is located on Embassy Row in Washington, D.C. in the old Charles Mason Remey House.

Permanent Representatives of Mexico to the Organization of American States 
Below is a list of the permanent representatives of Mexico at the OAS since its creation:

See also 
List of diplomatic missions of Mexico
Mexican Ministry of Foreign Affairs

References

External links
Permanent Mission of Mexico to the OAS in Washington DC(Spanish)

OAS
Mexico
Mexico
1948 establishments in Washington, D.C.
Mexico
Mexico–United States relations